The 2005 William & Mary Tribe football team represented the College of William & Mary as member of South Division of the Atlantic 10 Conference (A-10) during the 2005 NCAA Division I-AA football season. Led by Jimmye Laycock in his 26th year as head coach, William & Mary finished the season with an overall record of 5–6 and a mark of 3–5 in A-10 play, tying for third place in the South Division.

Schedule

References

William and Mary
William & Mary Tribe football seasons
William and Mary Indians football